Ninh Thủy is a fishing village located in the district-level town of Ninh Hòa, Khánh Hòa Province in the South Central Coast region of Vietnam. The location as an area for fishing dates to the time of ancient history. The village has white sand beaches and the water has a sea-green color.

Per local media sources, Ninh Thủy was formerly named Con Can, and the village under this name was formed some time in the 18th century.

See also

 List of fishing villages

References

External links
 Rambling through Ninh Thuy fishing villages. Vietnam Travel News.

Fishing communities in Vietnam
Populated places in Khánh Hòa province
Communes of Khánh Hòa province